Buthus elongatus is a scorpion species of the family Buthidae, found in southern Spain.

Distribution 
It is endemic to the province of Málaga and possibly to the province of Cádiz in Spain.

References 

Buthidae
Animals described in 2012
Scorpions of Europe
Endemic fauna of Spain